John Farley Leith, QC (5 May 1808 – 4 April 1887) was a British lawyer and Liberal politician.

Life
He was the eldest son of James Urquhart Murray Leith, of Barrach, Aberdeenshire, killed in 1814 at the Battle of Orthez with the 68th Regiment. He was educated at Marischal College and Aberdeen University. He studied law at the Middle Temple and was called to the bar in 1830.

Leith practised as a barrister in the Calcutta High Court from 1832 to 1846 and was then
Professor of Law at the East India Company's Haileybury College from 1853 to 1857. He was made QC in 1872 and a bencher in 1874.

He was elected MP for Aberdeen at a by-election in 1872 but stood down at the 1880 general election.

Leith died in 1887.

Family
In 1832 Leith married Alicia Anne, the daughter of Samuel Tomkins (the elder) of London, a banker, with whom he had issue. Their daughter Mary Anne married Sir William Miller, 1st Baronet. Their sons included Edward Tyrrell Leith, law professor at the University of Bombay, and the barrister William Gordon Ernest Leith.

References

External links
 

1808 births
1887 deaths
People from Aberdeenshire
Alumni of the University of Aberdeen
Members of the Middle Temple
British India judges
Members of the Parliament of the United Kingdom for Aberdeen constituencies
Scottish Liberal Party MPs
UK MPs 1868–1874
UK MPs 1874–1880
Masters of Haileybury and Imperial Service College